Troshkino is a rural locality (a village) in Novonadezhdinsky Selsoviet, Blagoveshchensky District, Bashkortostan, Russia. The population was 284 as of 2010. There are 3 streets.

Geography 
Troshkino is located 19 km northeast of Blagoveshchensk (the district's administrative centre) by road. Sedovka is the nearest rural locality.

References 

Rural localities in Blagoveshchensky District